Øksnevad college, (Øksnevad Videregående Skole in Norwegian) is a farming and land-using secondary school located in Klepp, Rogaland. It is the only public school in the whole of Rogaland who graduates gardeners, and are one of Norway's largest schools in terms of the school's property, it is however one of the smallest in terms of students. It is currently in full "swing" in attempts of having more students graduated.

Graduations on Øksnevad 

Graduation #1. Land-using and farming. This is the oldest line on Øksnevad, it is the main line for graduating farmers more land-using workers. As of the school year 2013, this is the graduation with the most students off all the graduations on Øksnevad.

Graduation #2. Horse and competition. This is the second-oldest line on Øksnevad. It mainly graduates students who want to become horse-trainers. But all sorts of jobs associated with horses are available after graduation on this line.

Graduation #3. Gardeners. This is the youngest line on Øksnevad. It mainly graduates gardeners, but some students graduates both on this line and on line #1.

Transport to Øksnevad 

Because Øksnevad is located on a place where there's not a very high demand for public transports, there's just two bus lines driving by the school each day; line 52, and line X44.

Education in Rogaland